Trans Amadi is a thousand-hectare (2,500-acre) industrial area, as well as a diverse residential neighborhood, in the city  of Port Harcourt. Situated at 4°48'53" N latitude and  7°2'14" E longitude, the neighborhood supports a strong  manufacturing sector and is considered to be a major industrial zone in Port Harcourt. Materials such as glass bottles, tires,  aluminium and paper have production plants in the area.

The main abattoir of the city is also located along Trans Amadi.

As of June 2003, there are 248 new and completed residential units existing with previous estimates of the total number of  dwellings in the neighborhood.

Education
The major schools providing educational services within the Trans Amadi axis are:

 Trans Amadi International School, 32 St. Andrew's Street, Rumuobiakani. A privately operated mainstream school serving  the 2 to 11 age range.
 Dietams International Schools, Plot 85/86 Federal Housing Estate.
 Graceland International School

Landmarks
The Port Harcourt Zoo is located in Trans Amadi. The zoo was first opened to the public on October 1, 1975.

References

External links

Neighbourhoods in Port Harcourt
Populated places in Rivers State
Economy of Port Harcourt
Obio-Akpor